Polybaphes sanguinolenta is a species of fruit and flower chafers belonging to the family Scarabaeidae, subfamily Cetoniinae.

Description
Elytra are black with yellow markings.

It is considered a pest of Pearl millet (Pennisetum glaucum) and cotton.

Distribution
This species is widespread in West, East and South Africa (Senegal, Benin, Cameroon, Congo, Ethiopia, Ivory Coast, RCA, South Africa, Uganda).

References

External links
 Flower Beetles
 Kaefer der welt

Cetoniinae
Beetles described in 1789